Jean Carlos de Souza Irmer (born 26 September 1994), simply known as Jean,  is a Brazilian professional footballer who plays as a defensive midfielder for Juventude.

Career
Jean started his career in his hometown, Taguatinga, Federal District, playing in amateur leagues. In 2012, he moved to Iguaçu Agex in Curitiba. Shortly after, he was acquired by Argentinean club Estudiantes de La Plata. He participated in their youth squads, but did not have many chances in the professional team, prompting his return to Brazil's Paraná.

He was a regular member of the team until August 2016, when he signed with then defending national champions Sport Club Corinthians Paulista for a rumored fee of R$400,000.

On 22 September 2020, Jean Irmer signed with Marítimo.

On 14 July 2021, he moved to Gil Vicente on a two-year deal.

Career statistics

References

External links

1993 births
Living people
Sportspeople from Federal District (Brazil)
Brazilian footballers
Association football midfielders
Campeonato Brasileiro Série A players
Campeonato Brasileiro Série B players
Primeira Liga players
Estudiantes de La Plata footballers
Paraná Clube players
Sport Club Corinthians Paulista players
CR Vasco da Gama players
Botafogo de Futebol e Regatas players
C.S. Marítimo players
Gil Vicente F.C. players
Esporte Clube Juventude players
Brazilian expatriate footballers
Expatriate footballers in Portugal